Numerous foreign films have been shot in the Philippines either partly or entirely, with the locations either representing itself or standing in for another location. This article presents a partial list of films which have used shooting locations in the Philippines sorted by year. The list exclude co-produced films with involvement of Philippine production companies.

List

Films primarily shot in the Philippines

Films partially shot in the Philippines

See also
List of Philippine co-produced films and television series

References

External links
Most Popular Titles With Location Matching "Philippines" , Internet Movie Database.

Hollywood in the Philippines, New Straits Times, December 11, 1990, p. 21.

 
Philippines
Cinema of the Philippines
Foreign films shot